Kafiluddin Mahmood was a Bangladeshi administrator and minister of the Shahabuddin Ahmed caretaker government.

Career
Uddin started his career in the Pakistan Civil Service. He served as the Finance Secretary of Bangladesh. He was the former Chairman of National Board of Revenue. He served as the adviser in charge of the Ministry of Finance in the Shahabuddin Ahmed caretaker government.

Death
Uddin died on 7 January 2011.

References

2011 deaths
Advisors of Caretaker Government of Bangladesh
University of Dhaka alumni